Southeastern Community College v. Davis, 442 U.S. 397 (1979), was a United States Supreme Court Case from 1979. Its plaintiff was a hearing-impaired student who, after being denied access to the school's nursing department, filed a lawsuit against claiming injustice to the Fourteenth amendment and to Section 504 of the Rehabilitation Act of 1973.

Background 
Frances Davis was a student at Southeastern Community College and applied for the nursing program. Davis also had a hearing impairment, thus, her hearing was very poor and she relied mostly on lip-reading, even with a hearing aid. When she was interviewed, the problem was quickly noticed and she was told to consult an audiologist. Davis was diagnosed with a “bilateral, sensori-neural hearing loss,” and even with an improvement with a hearing aid she would only be able to dictate speech when someone spoke directly to her.

The Executive Director of the State Board of Nursing reviewed her application and decided that it would not be safe for her to be a student in the program or to be a nurse. It was also decided that the accommodations that would have to be made for Davis would stop her from fully benefiting from the program. Davis asked the board to review the application once again, but was denied.

After the second attempt, Davis filed a lawsuit claiming the school was denying her of the Fourteenth amendment and Section 504 of the Rehabilitation Act of 1973.

Decision 
The District Court decided that because Davis was not able to work adequately as a nurse, then she was not protected under Section 504, which states that a person must be able to perform all duties of a job, despite their disability.

According to The Law and Higher Education, the court stated that “In many situations such as an operation room intensive care unit, or post-natal care unit, all doctors and nurses wear surgical masks which would make lip-reading impossible. Additionally, in many situations, a Registered Nurse would be required to instantly follow a physician’s instructions concerning procurement of various types of instruments and drugs where the physician would be unable to get the nurse’s attention by other than vocal means.” 

The Fourth Circuit reversed the district court's decision by pointing to recent administrative regulations regarding § 504 promulgated while Davis's appeal was pending. The Supreme Court then reversed the Fourth Circuit, holding that the ability to hear was crucial in a nurse's daily work, and the necessary accommodations that the program would need to provide for Davis were beyond what § 504 requires.

After the case 
Southeastern Community College vs Davis was a landmark case because it helped define the outlines of Section 504 regarding reasonable accommodations and what accommodations would drastically impact a program. It was the first case that brought attention to Section 504 and now any program does not have to make changes that would affect the core of the program or that would have an unnecessary financial burden.

References

External links
 

1979 in United States case law
Special education in the United States
United States disability case law
United States Supreme Court cases
United States Supreme Court cases of the Burger Court